"Truly Yours" is the third single from American hip hop duo Kool G Rap & DJ Polo's 1989 debut album Road to the Riches. It was released as a single with "Cold Cuts" as a B-side and later also featured on the compilation albums Killer Kuts (1994), The Best of Cold Chillin' (2000), Greatest Hits (2002) and Street Stories: The Best of Kool G Rap & DJ Polo (2013).

Background
The song is a diss track aimed at an unnamed woman who Kool G Rap either dated or wanted to date and who possibly left him or turned him down for a drug dealer. In the end, however, the drug dealer is in jail, the girl is working a menial job and living a questionable lifestyle, and G Rap is a successful recording artist.

In the song's second verse, G Rap uses several homophobic slurs against the drug dealer boyfriend, which caused some controversy at the time. In a 2014 interview, Kool G Rap recalled:

Samples
"Truly Yours" samples the following songs:
"N.T." by the Kool & the Gang
"Sexy Woman" by Timmy Thomas

And was later sampled on:
"Dedicated to the City" by Subsonic 2 featuring Guru
"Truly Yours '98" by Pete Rock featuring Kool G Rap and Large Professor
"Go With the Flow" by MF Doom
"The Crab Inn" by Heltah Skeltah
"$ Ova Bitches" by Kool G Rap

Track listing
A-side
 "Truly Yours" (Remix Vocal) (5:13)

B-side
 "Truly Yours" (Dub) (5:13)
 "Cold Cuts" (LP Version) (3:52)

References

External links
 "Truly Yours" at Discogs

1989 singles
Kool G Rap songs
Songs written by Marley Marl
Songs written by Kool G Rap
Hardcore hip hop songs
1988 songs
Song recordings produced by Marley Marl
Cold Chillin' Records singles
Warner Records singles